Robert Cullen may refer to:

 Robert Cullen (footballer) (born 1985), Japanese footballer for Dutch side VVV-Venlo
 Robert Cullen, Lord Cullen (1742–1810), Scottish judge

See also
 Robb Cullen, writer, actor and producer
 Robert
 Cullen (disambiguation)